Joannes or John Zonaras (1070 –  1140) was a Byzantine Greek historian, chronicler and theologian who lived in Constantinople (modern-day Istanbul, Turkey). Under Emperor Alexios I Komnenos he held the offices of head justice and private secretary (protasēkrētis) to the emperor, but after Alexios' death, he retired to the monastery on the Island of Hagia Glykeria, (İncir Adası, in the Bay of Tuzla), where he spent the rest of his life writing books.

Life 
Almost nothing is known of Zonaras's life. However, various elements can be inferred from his own writings. In one of his writings he states that he "saw" the second marriage of an emperor. This could have been the marriage of Nikephoros III with Maria of Alania in late 1078 or perhaps even the marriage of Manuel I Komnenos to Maria of Antioch in 1161 which would put Zonaras' death signifcantly later. It's not known with certainty if Zonaras served under John II Komnenos (r. 1118–1143), although this is still a possibility. Zonaras' Epitome served as the basis of Constantine Manasses' chronicle, which was commissioned by Irene Komnene, the widow of the sebastokrator Andronikos Komnenos. Given that Irene died on (or shortly before) 1153, this work must have been written  1150 or 1145. Furthermore, it's possible that Irene requested this shorter chronicle precisely because she had already seen Zonaras' Epitome. Therefore, it can be inferred that Zonaras had already died by 1145.

Written works 
His most important work, Extracts of History, in eighteen books, extends from the creation of the world to the death of Alexius (1118). The earlier part is largely drawn from Josephus; for Roman history he chiefly followed Cassius Dio up to the early third century. Contemporary scholars are particularly interested in his account of the third and fourth centuries, which depend upon sources, now lost, whose nature is fiercely debated. Central to this debate is the work of Bruno Bleckmann, whose arguments tend to be supported by continental scholars but rejected in part by English-speaking scholars. An English translation of these important sections has recently been published. The chief original part of Zonaras' history is the section on the reign of Alexios I Komnenos, whom he criticizes for the favour shown to members of his family, to whom Alexios entrusted vast estates and significant state offices. His history was continued by Nicetas Acominatus.

Various ecclesiastical works have been attributed to Zonaras — commentaries on the Church Fathers and the poems of Gregory of Nazianzus; lives of Saints; and a treatise on the Apostolic Canons — and there is no reason to doubt their genuineness. The lexicon, however, which has been handed down under his name (ed. J. A. H. Tittmann 1808) is probably the work of a certain Antonius Monachus (Stein's Herodotus, ii.479 f).  The first ecclesiastical denunciation of the game of chess on the part of the Eastern Orthodox Church was voiced by Zonaras. It was during his retirement as a monk to the monastery of Mount Athos that he wrote his commentary on the canons of the Eastern Church. The Quinisext Council required both clergy and laity to give up the use of dice (Canon 50). Zonaras wanted chess to also be included for clergy and laity to give up.

Zonaras, commenting on Canon 50, wrote, "Because there are some of the Bishops and clergy who depart from virtue and play chess (zatikron) or dice or drink to excess, the Rule commands that such shall cease to do so or be excluded; and if a Bishop or elder or deacon or subdeacon or reader or singer do not cease so to do, he shall be cast out: and if laymen be given to chess-playing and drunkenness, they shall be excluded."

Notes

References

 
 
 Dictionary of Greek and Roman Biography and Mythology, William Smith, ed., Little, Brown and Company, Boston (1849), vol. III, p. 1331 ("Joannes Zonaras").
 Harper's Dictionary of Classical Literature and Antiquities, Harry Thurston Peck, ed. (Second Edition, 1897), p. 1684 ("Ioannes Zonaras").
 Oxford Classical Dictionary, N. G. L. Hammond and H. H. Scullard, eds., Clarendon Press, Oxford (Second Edition, 1970), p. 1147 ("Johannes Zonaras").
 Thomas Banchich and Eugene Lane, The History of Zonaras from Alexander Severus to the Death of Theodosius the Great, Routledge (2009).

External links

Complete works of Zonaras in Greek at the Perseus Digital Library
Corpus Scriptorum Historiae Byzantinae: Ioannes Zonaras. Immanuel Bekker ed. Greek text with Latin translation. vol. 1, vol. 2, vol. 3
Editio princeps: Ioannis Zonarae Monachi, qui olim Byzantii Magnus Drungarius excubiaru[m] seu Biglae, & protosecretarius fuit, compendium Historiarum : in tres Tomos distinctum. 3 vols., Greek text with Latin translation. Oporinus, Basel 1557. vol.1, vol. 2, vol.3 (Bavarian State Library)
Epitome Historion in Greek at the Open Library
Epitome Historion in Greek at the Poesia latina site
French History form Severus Alexander to Justinian in Wikisource
Opera Omnia by Migne Patrologia Graeca with analytical indexes
Lexicon of Zonaras in Greek at OPenn

12th-century Byzantine historians
12th-century Eastern Orthodox theologians
Byzantine theologians
Officials of Alexios I Komnenos
Byzantine chronicles
Year of birth unknown
Year of death unknown
People associated with Mount Athos